Amiya Kumar Mallick (born 14 November 1992) is an Indian sprinter who holds the 100 metres national record of 10.26 seconds.

Personal life
Mallick was born on 14 November 1992 in Olansh, Cuttack district, Orissa. His father works in Bhubaneswar as a section officer in the education department of the state government and his mother is a housewife. As of 2016, Mallick is pursuing an MBA at the KIIT University in Bhubaneswar.

Career
Mallick won the silver medal in 100 metres at the 2006 Junior Asian Meet in Colombo and bronze in 200 metres at the 2008 Commonwealth Youth Games, clocking 21.33 seconds. In October 2011, he suffered a left quadricep injury which left him bed-ridden for six months after which he had to use crutches to walk. He returned to sprinting in December 2012, while his doctors told him that it will not be possible for him to match his previous timings.

Mallick came into limelight after winning gold medal at the National Open Athletics Championships at Ranchi in 2013 by recording 21.22 seconds. In 2014, he trained for four months under Glen Mills, who coached Usain Bolt and Yohan Blake, at the Racers Track Club in Kingston. The training which costed 16 lakh was funded by his father, the state association and some sponsors, and helped him change his running technique.

Mallick set the national 100 metres record on 28 April 2016 during the semifinals of the National Federation Cup in New Delhi, running 10.26 seconds. He bettered the previous national record of 10.30 seconds jointly held by Anil Kumar Prakash (2005) and Abdul Najeeb Qureshi (2010). Having clocked 10.35 seconds during the heats of the same event, Mallick suffered a hamstring strain during the semifinal. He ran the final with his thigh heavily strapped and finished fourth with a timing of 10.51.

At the 2017 Asian Athletics Championships in Bhubaneswar, Mallick was disqualified from the 100 metres semifinals because of a false start. He was part of the 4 × 100 metres relay team which was also disqualified in the heats due to a baton exchange infraction by himself. He qualified for the final of the 200 metres event in which he finished with a personal best time of 21.03 seconds.

References

External links
 

1992 births
Living people
People from Cuttack district
Indian male sprinters
Athletes from Odisha
Kalinga Institute of Industrial Technology alumni